The 1908–09 Holy Cross Crusaders men's basketball team represented The College of the Holy Cross during the 1908–09 college men's basketball season. The head coach was Fred Powers, coaching the crusaders in his seventh season.

Schedule

|-

References

Holy Cross Crusaders men's basketball seasons
Holy Cross